Adelocaryum is a genus of flowering plants belonging to the family Boraginaceae.

Its native range is southern Arabian Peninsula and the Indian subcontinent.

Species
The following species are accepted:

Adelocaryum coelestinum 
Adelocaryum flexuosum 
Adelocaryum lambertianum 
Adelocaryum malabaricum 
Adelocaryum nebulicola

References

Boraginaceae
Boraginaceae genera